Asthenotricha straba is a moth in the family Geometridae first described by Louis Beethoven Prout in 1921. It is found in Angola, Cameroon, the Democratic Republic of the Congo, Kenya, Tanzania and Uganda.

References

Moths described in 1921
Asthenotricha
Moths of Africa